Hydrographics may refer to:

Hydrography, the measurement of physical characteristics of waters and marginal land
Hydrographics (printing), a printing technique for three-dimensional objects
 Hydrographic Department, UK agency for providing hydrographic and marine geospatial data
 Hydrographic surveys, science of measurement and description of features which affect maritime navigation, construction, dredging, oil exploration, and drilling
Atlas Hydrographic, a hydrographic and oceanographic systems company

See also
International Hydrographic Organization
List of Members of the International Hydrographic Organization